is a 2012 Japanese comedy film directed by Shinobu Yaguchi and starring Mickey Curtis and Yuriko Yoshitaka. Curtis, who goes by the stage name Igarashi Shinjirō in this film, plays the role of a 73-year-old man, while Yoshitaka stars as a robots-obsessed college student.

Robo-G was released in Japanese cinemas on 14 January 2012.

The song in the final credits is an adaptation of Mr. Roboto

Cast
 Mickey Curtis as Shigemitsu Suzuki, a 73-year-old man.
 Yuriko Yoshitaka as Yoko Sasaki, a college student who is obsessed with robots.
 Gaku Hamada as Hiroki Kobayashi, one of the robot developers at Kimura Electronics.
 Junya Kawashima as Shinya Nagai, one of the robot developers at Kimura Electronics.
 Shogo Kawai as Koji Ota, one of the robot developers at Kimura Electronics.
 Tomoko Tabata as Yayoi Itami
 Takehiko Ono as Sōsuke Kimura
 Emi Wakui	as Saito Harue

Reception
The film grossed ¥1.16 billion in Japan.

References

External links
  
 

2012 films
Films directed by Shinobu Yaguchi
2010s Japanese films